Vedeneeva or Vedeneyeva is a female Russian surname Веденеева. Notable people with the surname include:

 Ekaterina Vedeneeva (born 1994), Russian-Slovenian rhythmic gymnast
 Nina Vedeneyeva (1882–1955), Russian physicist
 Tatyana Vedeneyeva (born 1953), Soviet and Russian actress

Russian-language surnames